Willette is an unincorporated community in Macon County, Tennessee, United States.  It is concentrated around the intersection of State Route 56, State Route 80, and State Route 262 in the southeastern part of the county.  It is home to a volunteer fire department, several churches, and several small businesses.

References

Unincorporated communities in Macon County, Tennessee
Unincorporated communities in Tennessee